Buzzkill may refer to:
Buzzkill (TV series)
"Buzzkill" (CSI: NY episode)
"Buzzkill" (song), by Luke Bryan
"Buzz-Kill", a song by Dune Rats from The Kids Will Know It's Bullshit
Buzzkill, a 2008 film by Second City

See also
"Buzzkill(er)", a 2014 song by the Dead Weather